Nils Erik Ulset (born July 16, 1983 in Tingvoll) is a Norwegian biathlete, cross-country skier, and three-time Paralympic champion.

Biography
He competed at the 2002 Winter Paralympics in Salt Lake, where he took two gold medals in cross-country skiing, one in 10 km, LW2-4 and one in 20 km, standing. In biathlon he placed 7th in the 7.5 km, standing.

At the 2006 Winter Paralympics in Torino, he took two bronze medals in biathlon: The 12.5 km and 7.5 km, standing. In cross-country skiing he placed 9th in the men's 10 km, 14th in the 20 km and 9th in the 5 km, standing.

He won silver at the 2010 Winter Paralympics in Vancouver, for 3km pursuit standing biathlon. He won gold at the 12.5 km standing biathlon. In cross-country skiing he took the silver medal in the men's 20 km, standing and bronze in the men's relay.

References

External links 
 
 

1983 births
Living people
Paralympic biathletes of Norway
Paralympic cross-country skiers of Norway
Biathletes at the 2002 Winter Paralympics
Cross-country skiers at the 2002 Winter Paralympics
Biathletes at the 2006 Winter Paralympics
Cross-country skiers at the 2006 Winter Paralympics
Biathletes at the 2010 Winter Paralympics
Cross-country skiers at the 2010 Winter Paralympics
Paralympic gold medalists for Norway
Paralympic silver medalists for Norway
Paralympic bronze medalists for Norway
Biathletes at the 2014 Winter Paralympics
Cross-country skiers at the 2014 Winter Paralympics
Medalists at the 2002 Winter Paralympics
Medalists at the 2006 Winter Paralympics
Medalists at the 2010 Winter Paralympics
Medalists at the 2014 Winter Paralympics
Norwegian male biathletes
Biathletes at the 2018 Winter Paralympics
Medalists at the 2018 Winter Paralympics
Paralympic medalists in cross-country skiing
Paralympic medalists in biathlon